One-hitter may refer to:
One-hitter (baseball), a baseball game in which one team was limited to one hit
One-hitter (smoking),  a type of smoking apparatus

See also
One Hitter, a racehorse